Redipuglia is a baseball team in Serie A federale, Italy's professional baseball league. 
It is based in Fogliano Redipuglia.

Baseball teams in Italy